Nabaluia is a genus of flowering plants from the orchid family, Orchidaceae. It contains 3 known species, all endemic to Borneo.

Nabaluia angustifolia de Vogel, Blumea 30: 202 (1984) - Sabah, Sarawak
Nabaluia clemensii Ames, Orchidaceae 6: 71 (1920)  - Sabah
Nabaluia exaltata de Vogel, Blumea 30: 202 (1984) - Sabah, Sarawak

See also 
 List of Orchidaceae genera

References 

 Pridgeon, A.M., Cribb, P.J., Chase, M.A. & Rasmussen, F. eds. (1999). Genera Orchidacearum 1. Oxford Univ. Press.
 Pridgeon, A.M., Cribb, P.J., Chase, M.A. & Rasmussen, F. eds. (2001). Genera Orchidacearum 2. Oxford Univ. Press.
 Pridgeon, A.M., Cribb, P.J., Chase, M.A. & Rasmussen, F. eds. (2003). Genera Orchidacearum 3. Oxford Univ. Press
 Berg Pana, H. 2005. Handbuch der Orchideen-Namen. Dictionary of Orchid Names. Dizionario dei nomi delle orchidee. Ulmer, Stuttgart

External links 
 

Orchids of Borneo
Arethuseae genera
Coelogyninae